Lomont is a commune in the Haute-Saône department in the region of Bourgogne-Franche-Comté in eastern France.

A high power sound broadcasting and television transmitting station is operated by TDF in the forest near the village to serve the greater Besançon area.

See also
Communes of the Haute-Saône department

References

Communes of Haute-Saône